Stelis perpulchra is a species of insect in the family Megachilidae. It is found in Central America and North America.

References

 Hinojosa-Díaz I (2008). "The giant resin bee making its way west: First record in Kansas (Hymenoptera: Megachilidae)". ZooKeys 1: 67–71.

Further reading

 Arnett, Ross H. (2000). American Insects: A Handbook of the Insects of America North of Mexico. CRC Press.

Megachilidae
Insects described in 1916